Atla alaskana is a species of saxicolous (rock-dwelling), crustose lichen in the family Verrucariaceae. Found in Alaska, it was formally described as a new species in 2015 by Sanja and Leif Tibell. The lichen has a thick, whitish-grey thallus with a granular to verrucose (warted) texture.

References

Verrucariales
Lichen species
Lichens described in 2015
Taxa named by Leif Tibell
Lichens of Subarctic America